Andrus Eelmäe (born 27 July 1956, in Pärnu) is an Estonian actor.

His parents are actors Lembit Eelmäe and Herta Elviste.

From 1975 to 1998 he worked at Vanemuine Theatre.

Filmography

 "Kelgukoerad" (television series: role?)
 "Kättemaksukontor" (television series: role?)
 "Ühikarotid" (television series: role?)
 2013 "Naabriplika" (television series; role: sacristan Viktor Kosar)
 2015 "Vehkleja" (feature film; role?)
 2016 "Savisaare protsess" (television series; role: boss of the department)

References

Living people
1956 births
Estonian male stage actors
Estonian male film actors
Estonian male television actors
20th-century Estonian male actors
21st-century Estonian male actors
People from Pärnu